This article is about the list of C.D. Primeiro de Agosto women's basketball players.  Clube Desportivo Primeiro de Agosto is an Angolan basketball club based in Luanda, Angola and plays at Pavilhão Victorino Cunha.  The club was established in 1977.

2011–2018

2001–2010
C.D. Primeiro de Agosto basketball players 2001–2010  = Angola league winner; = African champions cup winner

B Team players

See also
 List of C.D. Primeiro de Agosto men's basketball players
 List of C.D. Primeiro de Agosto (football) players
 List of Angola national basketball team players

References

C.D. Primeiro de Agosto basketball players
Lists of women's basketball players